Alsény Camara is the name of:

Alsény Camara (footballer, born 1986), Guinean footballer who played as a defender
Alsény Camara (footballer, born 1995), aka Alsény Camara Agogo, Guinean footballer who played as a forward
Alsény Camara (footballer, born 1996), aka Alsény Camara Cantona, Guinean footballer who played as a defender